Allan Ramon "Red" Staley (September 21, 1928 – April 7, 2019) was a Canadian professional ice hockey centre. He played one game in the National Hockey League with the New York Rangers during the 1948–49 season. The rest of his career, which lasted from 1948 to 1953, was spent in the minor leagues.

Biography 
Staley played one National Hockey League game for the New York Rangers during the 1948–49 NHL season, on November 14, 1948 against the Toronto Maple Leafs. The rest of his career was spent in the minor leagues and senior leagues, and he retired in 1953.

Staley died on April 7, 2019 at a hospital in Saskatoon, Saskatchewan, at the age of 90.

Career statistics

Regular season and playoffs

See also
 List of players who played only one game in the NHL

References

External links

1928 births
2019 deaths
Canadian expatriate ice hockey players in the United States
Canadian ice hockey centres
Ice hockey people from Saskatchewan
New Haven Ramblers players
New York Rovers players
New York Rangers players
Regina Pats players
Saskatoon Quakers players
Sportspeople from Regina, Saskatchewan
Western International Hockey League players